Bullit may refer to

 Brabus Bullit, an automobile
 "Bullit" (song), a dance song from French music producer Watermät
 "The Bullit" or Gordon Bullit, recurring character in US TV series The O.C.
 Spencer Bullit, recurring character in US TV series The O.C.

See also

Bullitt (disambiguation)
Bullet (disambiguation)